Fort DeWolf was an American Civil War fort located just south of Shepherdsville, Kentucky.  It was placed so that the L&N railroad would bisect the fort, to better protect the vital railroad bridge over the Salt River.

See also
American Civil War fortifications in Louisville
Kentucky in the American Civil War
Louisville in the American Civil War

External links
Fort DeWolf on 10000 Trails

DeWolf
Former buildings and structures in Louisville, Kentucky
DeWolf
Louisville, Kentucky, in the American Civil War
Kentucky in the American Civil War
Tourist attractions in Kentucky